Sulabha Panandikar (born 9 April 1904, date of death unknown) was an Indian educator. She was given the Padma Shri award. She served as Director of Education of then Government of Bombay, inspectress of Schools, Chairman of the National Council for Women's Education and Member of the Central Revenue Board of Education.

In 1921, she was the first woman to win the Ellis Prize at the Matriculation examination and also the Jagannath Shankarshet Scholarship.

References

Indian women educational theorists
Articles created or expanded during Women's History Month (India) - 2014
Educators from Maharashtra
Women educators from Maharashtra
Recipients of the Padma Shri in literature & education
1904 births
Year of death missing
20th-century Indian educational theorists
20th-century women educators
20th-century Indian women